Camnago-Lentate railway station is a railway station in Italy. Located on the Milan–Chiasso railway, and linked with a branch of the Milan–Asso railway, it serves the town of Lentate sul Seveso, and particularly its suburb Camnago.

Services
Camnago-Lentate is served by lines S4 and S11 of the Milan suburban railway network, the former of which terminates here. Both of them are operated by the Lombard railway company Trenord.

See also
Milan suburban railway network

References

External links

Railway stations in Lombardy
Railway stations opened in 1849
Milan S Lines stations
1849 establishments in the Austrian Empire
Lentate sul Seveso
Railway stations in Italy opened in 1849